The Aston Valley Barrow Cemetery, or Ashton Valley Barrow Cemetery, is a group of Bronze Age bowl barrow and bell barrow tumuli located on the south facing edge of Codford Down on the west side of the valley of the Chitterne Brook, and within the civil parish of Codford, in Wiltshire, England. There were originally ten bowl barrows and a single bell barrow, but some of these have now been ploughed out. Only the bell barrow and five bowl barrows currently survive.

Context

Archaeology
Excavations at the barrows have revealed many Bronze Age and some possible Saxon urned cremations and other interments. The barrows were originally excavated by W.F. Cunnington in 1801, and recorded by Sir R. Colt-Hoare, with later excavations by the Reverend E.H. Steele in 1957; and with further correlations by Leslie Grinsell, also in 1957. Some burials and items were left in place by Cunnington, but others are now preserved at the Wiltshire Museum in Devizes.

The excavations by Colt-Hoare and Cunnington in the 1800s revealed most of the finds and interments. However, as the three-age system had not yet been introduced, and they were unable to properly date their finds, they were at a disadvantage when trying to interpret them.

The following table includes details for the eleven barrows and associated finds:

References

Further reading
 Wiltshire Museum finds records for the Ashton Valley Barrow Group

Iron Age sites in England
Archaeological sites in Wiltshire
History of Wiltshire
Scheduled monuments in Wiltshire